The Lone Rider in Ghost Town is a 1941 American Western film directed by Sam Newfield and written by Joseph O'Donnell. The film stars George Houston as the Lone Rider and Al St. John as his sidekick "Fuzzy" Jones, with Rebel Randall, Budd Buster, Frank Hagney and Stephen Chase. The film was released on May 16, 1941, by Producers Releasing Corporation.

This is the third movie in the "Lone Rider" series, which spans seventeen films—eleven starring George Houston, and a further six starring Robert Livingston.

Houston, once an opera singer, sang four songs in this film: "Old Cactus Joe", "In Old Spring Valley", "Sweet Suzanna" and "Under Prairie Skies". The songs were written by Johnny Lange and Lew Porter. This film was later released on DVD as Ghost Mine.

Plot
Tom Cameron, also known as the Lone Rider, and his sidekick, Fuzzy Jones, are called in to investigate if a ghost town actually has real ghosts haunting it. It turns out the truth is the "ghosts" are really the hideout for a gang of outlaws who fake the "ghosts" to keep people away.

Cast          
George Houston as Tom Cameron, the Lone Rider
Al St. John as Fuzzy Jones
Rebel Randall as Helen Clark 
Budd Buster as Moosehide Larson
Frank Hagney as O'Shea
Stephen Chase as Bob Sinclair 
Reed Howes as Jim Gordon
Charles King as Roberts
George Chesebro as Jed
Edward Peil Sr. as Dennis Clark
Arch Hall Sr. as Roper

See also
The "Lone Rider" films starring George Houston:
 The Lone Rider Rides On (1941)
 The Lone Rider Crosses the Rio (1941)
 The Lone Rider in Ghost Town (1941)
 The Lone Rider in Frontier Fury (1941)
 The Lone Rider Ambushed (1941)
 The Lone Rider Fights Back (1941)
 The Lone Rider and the Bandit (1942)
 The Lone Rider in Cheyenne (1942)
 The Lone Rider in Texas Justice (1942)
 Border Roundup (1942)
 Outlaws of Boulder Pass (1942)
starring Robert Livingston: 
 Overland Stagecoach (1942)
 Wild Horse Rustlers (1943)
 Death Rides the Plains (1943)
 Wolves of the Range (1943)
 Law of the Saddle (1943)
 Raiders of Red Gap (1943)

References

External links
 

1941 films
American Western (genre) films
1941 Western (genre) films
Producers Releasing Corporation films
Films directed by Sam Newfield
American black-and-white films
1940s English-language films
1940s American films